

Films

LGBT
1974 in LGBT history
1974
1974